Leucochrysa is a genus of green lacewings in the family Chrysopidae. As of 2013, there are 196 described species in Leucochrysa.

See also
 List of Leucochrysa species

References

Further reading

External links

 

Chrysopidae
Articles created by Qbugbot